Stone Deavours Barefield (July 28, 1927 – March 20, 2009) was an American lawyer and politician. He was a member of the Mississippi House of Representatives from 1960 to 1984.

Biography 
Stone Deavours Barefield was born on July 28, 1927, in Laurel, Mississippi. He was the son of Samuel Stephen Barefield, Sr. and Dinah (Deavours) Barefield. He graduated from Hattiesburg High School in 1945. He graduated from the University of Southern Mississippi with a bachelor's degree in 1952, and then graduated from the University of Mississippi School of Law. He became a licensed attorney in 1954. He was a member of the Mississippi House of Representatives from 1960 to 1984. He died unexpectedly at his house in Hattiesburg, Mississippi, on March 20, 2009.

References 

1927 births
2009 deaths
Members of the Mississippi House of Representatives
Mississippi lawyers
People from Hattiesburg, Mississippi